Devonta Cornellius Freeman (born March 15, 1992) is an American football running back who is a free agent. He played college football at Florida State and was drafted by the Atlanta Falcons in the fourth round of the 2014 NFL Draft.

High school career
Freeman attended Miami Central High School in West Little River, Florida. He helped lead the Rockets football team to the 2010 Class 6A state championship and was named the MVP after gaining 308 yards on 38 carries, falling just 20 yards shy of a state championship game record. As a senior, he ran for a Miami-Dade County leading 2,208 yards and 26 touchdowns, and also recorded 663 rushing yards and six touchdowns in the final two games of the state playoffs.

Considered a four-star recruit by Rivals.com, he was rated the best running back in the nation. He committed to Florida State on June 24, 2010.

College career
Freeman attended and played college football for Florida State from 2011 to 2013.

2011 season
As a freshman at Florida State, Freeman immediately became a major contributor to the Seminoles' running game in their 9–4 season. He had two games with over 100 rushing yards and had a stretch of four games of scoring at least one rushing touchdown through the end of October and the start of November. He recorded 120 carries for 579 rushing yards and eight touchdowns as a freshman. He finished the season as the Seminoles' leading rusher in major categories.

2012 season
As a sophomore, Freeman shared the backfield primarily with James Wilder Jr. and Chris Thompson. He recorded two 100+-yard rushing games and three games with two rushing touchdowns. Florida State finished with a 10–2 regular season record and qualified for the ACC Championship. In the ACC Championship against Georgia Tech, he had 59 rushing yards and a rushing touchdown in the 21–15 victory. As a sophomore in 2012, he had 111 carries for 660 yards and eight touchdowns.

2013 season
As a junior, Freeman provided strong and consistent production for the Seminoles. In the second game of the season against Nevada and the third game against Bethune-Cookman, Freeman went over 100 rushing yards and scored a rushing touchdown.. On October 5, against Maryland, he started a streak of ten straight games with a rushing touchdown. In that stretch was a game against Miami, where he had 78 rushing yards and two more rushing touchdowns to go along with 98 receiving yards and receiving touchdown. As a junior, Freeman was a first-team All-Atlantic Coast Conference (ACC) selection and helped the Florida State Seminoles win the 2014 BCS National Championship Game over Auburn by a score of 34–31. He rushed for over 1,000 yards, the first Seminole to do so since Warrick Dunn in 1996. Freeman finished the season with career highs in rushing yards (1,016), receiving yards (278), and touchdowns (15) despite splitting carries with James Wilder, Jr. and Karlos Williams in Florida State's backfield. He led the Seminoles in rushing in each of his three seasons in Tallahassee.

On January 11, 2014, Freeman announced he would forgo his senior season and enter the 2014 NFL Draft.

College statistics

Professional career
Freeman was drafted by the Atlanta Falcons in the fourth round with the 103rd overall pick in  the 2014 NFL Draft. He was the eighth running back selected in the draft.

Atlanta Falcons

2014 season
In his rookie season in 2014, Freeman shared touches with fellow running backs Steven Jackson, Jacquizz Rodgers, and Antone Smith. In his NFL debut, against the New Orleans Saints in Week 1 at the Georgia Dome, Freeman had two rushes for 15 yards and two receptions for 18 yards in the 37–34 overtime victory. Against the Detroit Lions in Week 8, he scored his first career touchdown, a seven-yard reception from Matt Ryan in the first quarter. Against the New Orleans Saints in Week 16, he scored his first career rushing touchdown, a 31-yard rush in the third quarter. He appeared in all 16 games during his rookie season but started none. In his rookie season, he accumulated 248 rushing yards on 65 carries, 225 receiving yards on 30 receptions, one rushing touchdown, and two receiving touchdowns.

2015 season
Freeman received his first career start on September 27 against the Dallas Cowboys in Week 3. Against the Cowboys, Freeman had a breakout performance by rushing for a then career-high 141 yards and three touchdowns on 30 carries. The next week, he rushed for three touchdowns again to go along with 68 rushing yards against the Houston Texans. In the following game against the Washington Redskins, he rushed for a career-high 153 yards to start a three-game streak of 100 yard performances from Weeks 4–7. In Week 11 against the Indianapolis Colts, Freeman recorded 43 yards off three carries before leaving in the first half with a concussion. By the end of the season, Freeman totaled 1,634 yards-from-scrimmage (5th in the NFL), 14 all-purpose touchdowns (1st) with 1,056 rushing yards (7th) and 11 rushing touchdowns (1st). He finished the 2015 season ranked third among NFL running backs in both receptions (73) and receiving yards (578) along with three receiving touchdowns. Following the season, Freeman was selected to the Pro Bowl, the first of his career, and was named a Second-team All-Pro. Freeman was named one of the captains, along with Geno Atkins of the Cincinnati Bengals, for Team Irvin in the 2016 Pro Bowl. He was ranked as the 50th best player in the NFL and the fifth best running back by his fellow players on the NFL Top 100 Players of 2016.

2016 season

Freeman and Tevin Coleman provided the Falcons with a solid running back combination to help pace a historic offense in 2016. In Week 3, against the New Orleans Saints, he had 14 carries for 155 yards and five receptions for 55 yards and a touchdown. The next week, against the Carolina Panthers, he scored his first rushing touchdown of the season in the 48–33 win. In Week 12, against the Arizona Cardinals, he churned out 60 yards and two touchdowns on 15 carries in the 38–19 victory. In the next game, a 29–28 loss to the Kansas City Chiefs, he had another two-touchdown performance on 15 carries for 56 yards. In Week 15, Freeman ran for 139 yards on 20 carries for three touchdowns in a 41–13 win over the San Francisco 49ers, and was named NFC Offensive Player of the Week. Freeman was named to his second consecutive Pro Bowl as an original selection behind Ezekiel Elliott and David Johnson, and played a significant role in the Falcons finishing with an 11–5 record and earning the #2 seed in the NFC. In the Divisional Round 36–20 victory over the Seattle Seahawks, Freeman had 14 carries for 45 yards and scored his first career postseason touchdown and also recorded four catches for 80 yards. In the NFC Championship 44–21 victory over the Green Bay Packers, Freeman recorded 14 carries for 42 yards and four receptions for 42 yards and scored his first career postseason receiving touchdown. In Super Bowl LI, where the Falcons lost 34–28 in overtime to the New England Patriots, Freeman would have 11 carries for 75 yards, two receptions for 46 yards, and scored the first points for either team on a rushing touchdown in the second quarter. Freeman was ranked as the 41st best player in the NFL and the sixth best running back by his fellow players on the NFL Top 100 Players of 2017.

2017 season
On August 9, 2017, Freeman signed a five-year, $41.25 million contract extension with the Falcons to become the highest paid running back in the NFL. In Week 1, against the Chicago Bears, he was limited to 37 rushing yards on 12 carries but had a touchdown in the 23–17 victory. In Week 2, in the 34–23 victory over the Green Bay Packers, he had 84 rushing yards and two touchdowns in the first game in the new Mercedes-Benz Stadium. Freeman's first touchdown was the first ever touchdown in the history of the new stadium. In Week 3, against the Detroit Lions, he recorded 106 rushing yards and a touchdown. Though splitting carries with Tevin Coleman, he scored five rushing touchdowns in the first four games to lead the NFL. In Week 15, against the Tampa Bay Buccaneers, he had 22 carries for 126 yards and a touchdown in the 24–21 victory. In the regular season finale against the Carolina Panthers, he had 23 rushing yards, 85 receiving yards, and a receiving touchdown in the 22–10 victory. The Atlanta Falcons finished with a 10–6 record and made the playoffs. Overall, Freeman finished with 865 rushing yards, seven rushing touchdowns, 36 receptions, 317 receiving yards, and one receiving touchdown in the 2017 season. In the Wild Card Round, against the Los Angeles Rams, he had 66 rushing yards and a rushing touchdown in the 26–13 victory. In the Divisional Round, he had a receiving touchdown in the 15–10 loss to the Philadelphia Eagles. The touchdown marked Freeman's fifth consecutive postseason game with a touchdown. He was ranked 70th by his peers on the NFL Top 100 Players of 2018.

2018 season
In Week 1, Freeman suffered a knee injury and missed the next three games. He returned in Week 5 before injuring his foot and experienced soreness in his groin. He missed the following week and was later revealed that Freeman required groin surgery. He was placed on injured reserve on October 16, 2018.

2019 season
In Week 6 against the Arizona Cardinals, Freeman had 118 scrimmage yards and two receiving touchdowns in the 33–34 loss. During Week 7 against the Los Angeles Rams, Freeman threw a punch at Aaron Donald, and was ejected.  Without Freeman, the Falcons lost 37–10. In Week 16, Freeman had 127 scrimmage yards, one rushing touchdown, and one receiving touchdown in the 24–12 victory over the Jacksonville Jaguars. In the 2019 season, Freeman finished with 656 rushing yards and two rushing touchdowns to go along with 59 receptions for 410 receiving yards and four receiving touchdowns. The Falcons released Freeman on March 16, 2020.

New York Giants

On September 23, 2020, Freeman signed a one-year, $3 million contract with the New York Giants. In Week 5, against the Dallas Cowboys, he recorded his first rushing touchdown as a Giant in the 34–37 loss. On November 13, 2020, he was placed on injured reserve with an ankle injury. He was placed on the reserve/COVID-19 list by the team on December 5, 2020, and moved back to injured reserve on December 17. He was designated to return from injured reserve the next day, and began practicing with the team again. He did not return before the end of the regular season, and the Giants waived Freeman on January 7, 2021. He appeared in five games and totaled 54 carries for 172 rushing yards and one rushing touchdown to go along with seven receptions for 58 receiving yards.

Buffalo Bills
On January 12, 2021, Freeman was signed to the Buffalo Bills' practice squad. His practice squad contract with the team expired after the season on February 1, 2021.

New Orleans Saints
Freeman signed with the New Orleans Saints on August 1, 2021. He was released on August 31, 2021.

Baltimore Ravens
On September 9, 2021, the Baltimore Ravens signed Freeman on their practice squad following injuries to J. K. Dobbins, Justice Hill, and Gus Edwards. On September 16, 2021, the Ravens signed Freeman to their active roster following the release of Trenton Cannon. In the 2021 season, Freeman appeared in 16 of the 17 games and recorded 133 carries for 576 rushing yards and five rushing touchdowns to go along with 34 receptions for 190 receiving yards and one receiving touchdown.

On September 13, 2022, the Houston Texans hosted Freeman for a workout.

NFL career statistics

Personal life
Freeman's jersey number with the Falcons was 24 in honor of an aunt who died at the age of 24 from a heart attack while Freeman was a teenager.

References

External links

 
 Florida State Seminoles bio

1992 births
Living people
American football running backs
Atlanta Falcons players
Baltimore Ravens players
Buffalo Bills players
Florida State Seminoles football players
National Conference Pro Bowl players
New Orleans Saints players
New York Giants players
People from Baxley, Georgia
Miami Central Senior High School alumni
Players of American football from Georgia (U.S. state)
Players of American football from Miami
Unconferenced Pro Bowl players